Intricate Unit (IU) is a band formed by Ben Kopec. IU incorporates live theatrics, including a huge box covered in circuit boards swinging on the venue's pipes 20 feet in the air to smash guitars live on stage.

History

Formation
After the album Denial, and shortly after graduating high school, Kopec formed the first original line up for Intricate Unit. He incorporated a drummer, Chris Densky, and live guitarist, Jay Saucier. The trio performed many live shows and opened for acts such as Dope, Hanzel Und Gretyl, Zeromancer, Bile, and Nocturne. This line up eventually dissolved because Densky decided to focus all his energy on this original band, Adva, and Saucier and Kopec had moral differences. Densky is currently the drummer for Deadstar Assembly.

IU then recruited two new live members. One, a live bassist named Roger Lockshier, known to the fans as Z, and secondly, a live guitarist, Mark Turko. Kopec knew it was necessary to be open minded.  It was with this line up that the trio incorporated a manual light show by stepping on switches created from electrical boxes during the live performance. The showcasing of what was to be known as "the frame" was also used during live performances. This cast a huge shadow on Kopec during the intro of their set while emerging to the music of Karl Orf's Carmina Burana.

Intricate Unit's current line up consists of keyboardist, Ryan Dest, known better as DJ Nitez, and live guitarist, Tom Voytek.

Deception (1999)
Ben Kopec released albums in high school three years before playing live. Kopec bought his first drum machine when he was 15 and first computer and sound module when he was 17. Once all the tools were in place, it took less than a year for him to compile his first EP, Deception. His mother recorded a vocal part for the song Pensive while Kopec was writing the song still living in his parents' house. The artwork on this album displays Kopec's like of the artist Leonardo da Vinci. To date, none of these songs have ever been played live.

Denial (2000)
Denial was released while Kopec was a senior in high school. This 13 track album marked the first full-length release for Intricate Unit. The songs on this album are very Industrial sounding compared to his later releases that sound more like Industrial rock. This is the album that Kopec also created the tri-circle, a symbolic idea of his own representing what he recognizes as three stages of life repeating. The three stages of life are birth, life, and death, encompassed in a circle, representing that when one dies, one is just going to be reborn. This idea is consistent with reincarnation.

Prior to the Denial release, Kopec had lost all of the audio due to a computer error and had to re-record all of the audio including vocals, guitars, and sound effects This delayed the release of the album by months.

Detached (2003–2004)
Before the original line up dissolved, Densky and Saucier performed live to help promote the release of Intricate Unit's second full-length album, Detached. Detached also had subsequent releases entitled, Detached (Detached). This latter album contained completely remixed and remastered songs with bonus tracks that would eventually appear on Thru-Hole. The cover of this album is a picture that Kopec edited himself of an ex-girlfriends bathroom tub after she died her hair red.

Thru-Hole (2005–2006)
Vaccination Nation was the band's first single and was released on this album.

Tours
Intricate Unit has performed with many other bands from the East Coast to the Mid-West. IU currently also receives radio play in over 15 states, as they expand their territory to becoming a national act. Intricate Unit has opened for such acts as Zeromancer, Insane Clown Posse, Hanzel Und Gretly, and Bile.

Discography

1999: Deception 
2000: Denial 
2002: Detached 
2005: Thru-Hole 
2009: TBA

Band members
Current lineup
 Ben Kopec – lead vocals, backup guitar (2001–present)

Music videos
2004: A Try to Keep Away 
2004: Angel Moth 
2005: Vaccination Nation

Influences
The likes of Intricate Unit have been compared to Nine Inch Nails, Marilyn Manson, Static-X, Ministry, KMFDM, and Leæther Strip.
Artists such as Trent Reznor and Danny Elfman have been an inspiration to Ben Kopec. Ben Kopec is also driven by people that challenge him to rise to higher levels. Other bands that have influenced the sound of IU are Skinny Puppy and White Zombie.

References

External links
Intricate Unit, official website

American industrial metal musical groups
Electronic music groups from Connecticut
Rock music groups from Connecticut
Musical groups established in 1999
1999 establishments in Connecticut